Alfred Mering (until 1936 Meering; 26 August 1903 Tallinn – 24 April 1988 Tallinn) was an Estonian actor and theatre director.

In 1927 he graduated from Estonian Drama Studio's theatre school. 1921-1924 he was a choir singer at Estonia Theatre. 1927-1936 (intermittently) he worked at Ugala Theatre. 1926-1929 and 1967-1984 he worked at Estonian Drama Theatre. 1932-1940 he worked at Vanemuine Theatre. 1946-1965 he was the artistic manager of Estonia Theatre.

Awards:
 1963: Estonian SSR merited artist

Productions of plays

 Faiko's "Õpetaja Bubus" (1927 in Ugala Theatre)
 Kálmán's "Mariza" (1929 and 1936 in Ugala Theatre)
 Kitzberg's and Simm's "Kosjasõit" (1929 in Ugala Theatre)

References

1903 births
1988 deaths
Estonian male stage actors
20th-century Estonian male actors
Estonian theatre directors
Male actors from Tallinn
Burials at Metsakalmistu
Soviet male actors